Eve Blau is an American historian and scholar, who teaches at the Graduate School of Design at Harvard University as a Professor of the History and Theory of Urban Form and Design, as well as Director of Research. Blau has contributed to scholarship on the history of architecture and urban design. In 2015 she received the Victor Adler State Prize (Victor Adler-Staatspreis für Gesichte sozialer Bewegungen 2015) from the Austrian Ministry of Science, Research, and Economy for her work on Red Vienna and her book The Architecture of Red Vienna: 1919-1934. The Victor Adler State Prize is given for scholarship that is distinguished by its interdisciplinary breadth, use of innovative methods, contemporary historical questions, and that is widely published. In 2018, she was named Fellow of the Society of Architectural Historians and in 2022, she was inducted into the American Academy of Arts & Sciences.

Early life and education
She was raised in Germany and Switzerland. Her parents were from Vienna, and her mother was of Czech descent.

Blau attended the University of York and received a Bachelor of Arts degree in English and Sociology. Her postgraduate studies in the History of Architecture took her to Yale University. There, Blau was awarded a Master of Arts in 1974 and a Doctor of Philosophy in 1978.

Career
Blau began her teaching career in the Art and Art History Department at Wesleyan University. She was the Head of the Department of Exhibitions and Publications (1984-1991) then Curator of Exhibitions and Publications (1991-2001) at the Canadian Centre for Architecture.

She was a Professor of the History of Architecture (2004-2011) in the Department of Architecture at the Harvard University Graduate School of Design, while Toshiko Mori was chair. Blau served as Director of the Master in Architecture Degree Programs (2008-2011). She has been part of the school's Department of Urban Planning and Design as Professor of the History and Theory of Urban Form and Design. In 2019, Blau was appointed as Director of Research by Mohsen Mostafavi.

Blau has held visiting professorships at McGill University (1983), Williams College (1995), and the University at Buffalo (2016).

From 1997-2000, Blau served as the Editor of the Journal of the Society of Architectural Historians.

Blau's research has focused extensively on a range of issues in architectural history and theory, specifically in Europe and Eurasia, as well as the intersection of urban spatial form and media. Her publications have covered topics such as Red Vienna in Austria and the petroleum industry in Azerbaijan.

Photography
Photographs attributed to Blau appear in the collection of the Conway Library at the Courtauld Institute of Art. Images captured includes religious and secular buildings, sculptures, and various communities. A linked exhibition of her work ran there from October 2017 to March 2018, which highlighted the architectural importance of the Greystone buildings in Montreal.

Works
The Architecture of Red Vienna, 1999, 
Project Zagreb: Transition as Condition, Strategy, Practice, with Ivan Rupnik, 2007, 
Architecture and Cubism, with Nancy Troy, 2012, 
Baku: Oil and Urbanism, 2018,

Awards
2000 Society of Architectural Historians Spiro Kostof Book Award for The Architecture of Red Vienna (1999) 
2001 Society of Architectural Historians Alice Davis Hitchcock Award for The Architecture of Red Vienna (1999)
2015 Victor Adler State Prize of the Republic of Austria for the German translation of The Architecture of Red Vienna (2014)
2018 Fellow of the Society of Architectural Historians
2019 DAM Architectural Book Award for Baku: Oil and Urbanism (2018)
2022 Elected Member of American Academy of Arts & Sciences

References

1951 births
Living people
American people of Czech descent
American architectural historians
Alumni of the University of York
Yale School of Architecture alumni
Wesleyan University faculty
Academic staff of McGill University
Williams College faculty
Harvard Graduate School of Design faculty
University at Buffalo faculty